Bakhar Bar is a village and union council near Shahpur Sadar, in Sargodha District in the Punjab province of Pakistan. Village name is after-named by the tribe caste "Bakhar" and they used to write Maher as their sub-caste. It is situated on the eastern side of the river Jehlum. It is at about 5 kilometers from Shahpur Sadar, and about 35 kilometers from Sargodha. And, it is largest village of Punjab in term of area which is occupied by a single tribe Bakhar since centuries.
The main crops of Bakhar Bar are sugarcane, wheat, oranges and rice. Bakhar Bar is about 900 years old.   The main occupation of the people is farming; however, a large number of people work in the government service.

Populated places in Sargodha District